Arthur Anderson Martin (26 March 1876 – 17 September 1916) was a New Zealand surgeon. He was born in Milton, South Otago, New Zealand on 26 March 1876. He studied at the University of Edinburgh, where he gained an M.D. in 1903. Dr. Martin served in the British Expeditionary Force & the Royal Army Medical Corps during World War I, and was fatally wounded during the battle of the Somme in 1916.  He died in Amiens, France.

References

1876 births
1916 deaths
New Zealand surgeons
People from Milton, New Zealand
British Army personnel of World War I
Royal Army Medical Corps officers
British military personnel killed in the Battle of the Somme